CoCo Brown is an American rapper, DJ and former pornographic actress.

Early life
Brown moved to Las Vegas with her family when she was in middle school. At age 15, she ran away from home and never returned.

Career

Adult entertainment
Brown was stripping at Déjà Vu in Las Vegas, where she danced for about seven months, when she was discovered by porn producer Nicky Starks. She entered the adult film industry in 1998. Her first scene was in Bomb Ass Pussy. She initially used the stage name Honey Love. In 2001, she signed an exclusive deal with DBM, a studio for which she did about 19 films. She began using the stage name CoCo Brown in her second film for the studio. She stopped performing in adult films in 2003. She once worked briefly as a dominatrix as well.

Music
Brown launched a music career after quitting porn. She rapped under the stage name Ms No Tonsils between 2004 and 2009. She is currently working as a DJ.

Suborbital flight
Brown had signed up to go on a suborbital flight in 2016, which would have lasted approximately one hour and would have provided 90 seconds of weightlessness. The flight was to have been arranged by the Space Expedition Corporation (SXC), a Netherlands-based space tourism company. This opportunity for her arose in 2012 when she received a "space luncheon" invite by a concierge she knew after another person canceled their appearance at the event. She began training for the flight, with help from XCOR Aerospace, that same year. In preparation for the trip, she had to earn a pilot's license. She was to have been the flight's co-pilot. If the trip had taken place as planned, she would have been the first pornographic actress on a suborbital high altitude flight. XCOR ceased operations and filed for bankruptcy in 2017 without flying a single person on their Lynx spaceplane.

Personal life
Brown moved to Germany in 1999. She was married to German millionaire Andreas Gauger between 2001 and 2010. She also has a son from a previous relationship.

Awards and nominations

References

External links

 
 
 
 
 
 

Actresses from Las Vegas
Actresses from Berlin
Actresses from Toledo, Ohio
African-American women rappers
African-American pornographic film actors
African-American DJs
American dominatrices
American expatriate actresses in Germany
American female erotic dancers
American erotic dancers
American pornographic film actresses
Women DJs
Living people
Musicians from Berlin
Pornographic film actors from Nevada
Pornographic film actors from Ohio
21st-century American rappers
21st-century American women musicians
21st-century women rappers
American women in electronic music
21st-century African-American women
21st-century African-American musicians
Year of birth missing (living people)